Beit Duqqu is a Palestinian village in the Jerusalem Governorate, located  northwest of Jerusalem in the central West Bank.  According to the Palestinian Central Bureau of Statistics, the town had a population of 1,600 in 2006.

Location
It is bordered by Beit 'Anan  to the east, At Tira  to the north, Beit Ijza and Al Jib to the west, and Al Qubeiba to the south.

History
Local residents believe that their ancestors arrived in the early 14th century in Beit Duqqu from the village of Umm Walad, in the south of Syria. Villagers belong to the families of Badr, Ali Hussein, Rayyan, Morrar, Dawood and Muslih.

Ottoman era
The population was 3 households, all Muslim. They paid a tax rate of 33.3% on agricultural products, which included wheat, barley,  olive  and fruit trees, goats and beehives in addition to "occasional revenues"; a total of 2,730 Akçe.

In 1838, it was noted as a Muslim village, located in the Beni Malik district, west of Jerusalem.

In 1870, Guérin described it as a "small village, situated on the top of a high hill." Socin found from an official Ottoman village list from about the same year (1870) that Beit Duqqu had a population of 125, with a total of 36 houses, though the population count only included men.

In 1883, the PEF's Survey of Western Palestine (SWP) described it as "A village of moderate size, standing high on a ridge, with a spring to the north-west and olives to the north. This was also a fief like [Beit 'Anan]."

In 1896, the population of Bet dukku was estimated to be about 114 persons.

British Mandate era
In the 1922 census of Palestine conducted by the British Mandate authorities, Bait Duqu had a population of 254, all Muslims, increasing in the  1931 census to 328 Muslims, in 84 inhabited houses.

In the 1945 statistics Beit Duqqu had a population of 420 Muslims, with 5,393 dunams of land, according to an official land and population survey. Of this, 1,610 dunams were plantations and irrigable land, 1,767 used for cereals, while 27 dunams were built-up (urban) land.

Jordanian era
In the wake of the 1948 Arab–Israeli War, and after the 1949 Armistice Agreements, Beit Duqqu came  under Jordanian rule.

In 1961, the population of Beit Duqqu was 537.

Post-1967

Since the Six-Day War in 1967, Beit Duqqu has been under Israeli occupation. The population in the 1967 census conducted by the Israeli authorities was 438, of whom 16 were refugees. 

After the 1995 accords, 10.6% of village land was classified as Area B, while the remaining 89.4% was classified as Area C. Israel has expropriated land from Beit Duqqu for the construction of the Israeli settlement Giv’at Ze’ev.

Beit Duqqu along with 9 other Palestinian villages, Biddu, Beit 'Anan, Beit Surik, Qatanna, al-Qubeiba, Beit Ijza, Kharayib Umm al Lahimand and at Tira form the "Biddu enclave" which, according to Tanya Reinhart, are "imprisoned" behind a wall, cut off from their orchards and farmlands that are being seized in order to form the real estate reserves of the Jerusalem Corridor and to create a territorial continuity with Giv'at Ze'ev. The enclave will be linked to Ramallah by underpasses and a road that is fenced on both sides. From the "Biddu enclave" Palestinians will travel along a fenced road that passes under a bypass road to Bir Nabala enclave, then on a second underpass under Bypass 443 to Ramallah. 

The main source of living is agriculture, mainly of apricots, olives and grapes.

References

Bibliography

External links
 Welcome To Bayt Duqqu
Survey of Western Palestine, Map 17:    IAA, Wikimedia commons 
Beit Duqqu Village (Fact Sheet),   Applied Research Institute–Jerusalem (ARIJ)
Beit Duqqu Village Profile, ARIJ
Beit Duqqu  aerial photo, ARIJ
Locality Development Priorities and Needs in Beit Duqqu, ARIJ
   Beit Duqqu village lands are threatened by the Segregation Wall, October 2, 2005, POICA. Archived: Beit Duqqu village lands are threatened by the Segregation Wall, 02, October, 2005, POICA

Villages in the West Bank
Jerusalem Governorate
Municipalities of the State of Palestine